Stephen Hopkins may refer to:

 Stephen Hopkins (Mayflower passenger) (c. 1581–1644), passenger on the Mayflower, one of forty-one signatories of the Mayflower Compact
 Stephen Hopkins (politician) (1707–1785), Rhode Island governor and signer of the Declaration of Independence
 SS Stephen Hopkins, a 1942 World War II Liberty ship named for him
 Stephen T. Hopkins (1849–1892), U.S. Representative from New York
 Stephen Hopkins (director) (born 1958), Jamaican-born film and television director
 Stephen Hopkins (musician) (born 1951), also known as Steve Hopkins, former England based musician and current physicist
 Steve Hopkins (composer), music composer, producer and musician based in Los Angeles, California
 Steve Hopkins (Mississippi politician) (born 1962), member of the Mississippi House of Representatives

Hopkins, Stephen